Maurice Anthony Crowley SPS, is an Irish born priest and who serves as Bishop of the Roman Catholic Diocese of Kitale, Kenya. Bishop Crowley is a member of the Saint Patrick's Society for the Foreign Missions.

Born in 1946 in Berrings, County Cork, Ireland, he earned a BSc from University College Cork in 1968, prior to completing his priestly formation with the Kiltegan Fathers and ordination in 1972. Fr. Crowley moved to Kenya in 1972.

From 1983 he served as Rector Mother of Apostles Seminary, Eldoret, Kenya, until 1998 and Vicar general Eldoret Catholic Diocese from  1992 until 1998. In 1998 he was appointed Bishop of the Catholic Diocese, Kitale, Kenya.

In 2017 Bishop Crowley was appointed by the Pope to oversee Eldoret diocese, prior to the appointment of a new bishop.

Crowley is a member of the council of the Catholic University of Eastern Africa. In 2020 Bishop Crowley was appointed to the first governing Council of Tangaza University College in Nairobi, following it being granted University status.

References

1946 births
20th-century Irish Roman Catholic priests
Roman Catholic missionaries in Kenya
20th-century Roman Catholic bishops in Kenya
21st-century Roman Catholic bishops in Kenya
Alumni of University College Cork
People from County Cork
Living people
Roman Catholic bishops of Kitale
Irish expatriates in Kenya